Gaspary's Sons is a 1948 German drama film directed by Rolf Meyer and starring Lil Dagover, Hans Stüwe and Inge Landgut. It was shot at the Bendestorf Studios near Hamburg and on location at Kleinwalsertal in western Austria. The film's sets were designed by the art director Erich Grave.

Synopsis
In 1933, a family is divided when the father and one son emigrate to democratic Switzerland while the mother and other son remain in Nazi Germany. The two branches of the family develop along very different paths.

Cast
 Lil Dagover as Margot von Korff
 Hans Stüwe as Robert Gaspary
 Anneliese von Eschstruth as Sylvia Genris
 Harald Holberg as Hans Gaspary
 Michael Tellering as Günther von Korff
 Inge Landgut as Christine
 Hans Zesch-Ballot as Dr. Grove
 Elise Aulinger as Frau Seelenmayr
 John Pauls-Harding as Pit
 Käte Pontow as Tinchen
 Walther Jung
 Katharina Mayberg

References

Bibliography 
 Bock, Hans-Michael & Bergfelder, Tim. The Concise Cinegraph: Encyclopaedia of German Cinema. Berghahn Books, 2009.

External links 
 

1948 films
1948 drama films
German drama films
1940s German-language films
Films directed by Rolf Meyer
West German films
German black-and-white films
1940s German films
Films shot in Austria